Giannis Papadimitriou (born 15 May 1976) is a Greek former professional footballer who played as a right-back.

Since 01/07/2010 is the sport director of the club Skoda Xanthi until today 2020. 
As a player he was present in all the big moments of the club ( final four of the Cup - 3 times Europa League ) and also as sport director one more time in Europe ( 2013–2014) and the 1 st time in the final of the Greek Cup (2014–15) . 
At his moment as sport director important coaches work for the club ( Ouzounidis- Lucescu R. -Rastavac ) .

References

External links

Profile at EPAE.org

1976 births
Living people
Greek footballers
Greece international footballers
Chalkida F.C. players
Xanthi F.C. players
Super League Greece players
Association football defenders
Xanthi F.C. non-playing staff
Footballers from Chalcis